Mikhail Mikhailovich Gromov (– 22 January 1985) was a Russian and Soviet military aviator, test pilot, and Hero of the Soviet Union.

Early life 
Gromov's father, Mikhail Konstantinovich Gromov, was of noble intelligentsia and served as military medic. His mother, Lyubov Ignatyevna Andreeva, was from peasant family and received training as an obstetrician. Gromov spent his childhood in Kaluga, Rzhev, Myza-Raevo (near Moscow). He graduated from Voskresensky Real School in Moscow, and went on to study at the IMTS from 1916 to 1917. In 1917, Gromov graduated from aviation theoretical courses at IMTS and started his army service.

Career

Institutional positions 
Upon graduation, Gromov served as a flight instructor and military pilot. In 1923, he won the Soviet championship in weightlifting. In 1925, he started working as a test pilot for the Air Force Research Institute testing the planes designed by Andrei Tupolev and Nikolai Polikarpov. From 1930 to 1941, Gromov then worked at the Central Aerohydrodynamic Institute and became chief-pilot.

From March to August 1941, Gromov was the first director of the Flight Research Institute, a flight research and testing centre in Zhukovsky. The name of M. M. Gromov was awarded to the institute in 1991 to celebrate the Institute's 50th anniversary.

After the war, Gromov was deputy commander of the Long-Range Aviation from 1946 to 1949. Later, till 1955, he was head of Department of flight service of Ministry of Aviation Industry. In 1955 he was discharged.

From 1937 to 1946, Gromov was deputy of the Supreme Soviet of the USSR (1st convocation).

In late 1940, he initiated the establishment of the Fedotov Test Pilot School.

Testing history 
Gromov was involved in extensive testing and promotion of Russian airplanes throughout Europe and Asia. For example, from June to September 1925, Gromov flew the Polikarpov R-1 in the long-haul group flight of nine aeroplanes on the route Moscow-Beijing-Tokyo. A year later, in 1926, Gromov completed a  European promotional flight in a Tupolev ANT-3 on the route Moscow-Königsberg-Berlin-Paris-Rome-Vienna-Prague-Warsaw-Moscow. Notably, on 25 April 1927, he made the first Soviet parachute jump out of a Polikarpov I-1 in a testing that involved the plane having entered into an unrecoverable spin. 

From 10 to 12 September 1934, Gromov, A. I. Filin, and I. T. Spirin made a record closed-circle non-stop flight on the route Moscow-Ryazan-Kharkov in a Tupolev ANT-25, flying  in 75 hours. Gromov was subsequently awarded the title of Hero of the Soviet Union for this feat.

Service in World War II 
During World War II, Gromov took command of several units:

 From December 1941 to February 1942, Gromov was commander of 31st Mixed Aviation Division (Kalinin Front).
From February to May 1942, he was commander of the Air Force of Kalinin Front.
From May 1942 to May 1943, he took command of the 3rd Air Army.
From May 1943 to June 1944, he was commander of the 1st Air Army.
From 1944 to 1946, Gromov was head of the Main Department of combat training of frontline aviation of the Air Force.

Miscellaneous 
From 1959 to 1961, Gromov headed the Weightlifting Federation of USSR. 

Gromov used his influence and renown to attain reconsideration of Sergei Korolev's case, which resulted in Korolev's transfer from the prison camp at Kolyma to TsKB-29.

Gromov lived in Moscow. Gromov's wife, Nina Georgievna Gromova (1922–2019), was an equestrian sportswoman. 

Gromov died on January 22 1985 in Moscow. He is buried at Novodevichy Cemetery.

Commemorations

Monuments

In philately

In phaleristics 
The Gromov Medal was established in March 2011 by the Gromov Flight Research Institute as a highest corporate award in memory of the founder of the institute.

References

External links
Biography on the old and frozen LII website
 Громов, Михаил Михайлович // Большая Советская Энциклопедия. / под ред. А. М. Прохорова. 3-е изд. том 7. М., «Советская энциклопедия», 1972
 S. P. Korolev. Encyclopedia of life and creativity / Editor C. A. Lopota, RSC Energia, 2014 

1899 births
1985 deaths
Russian aviators
Soviet World War II pilots
Heroes of the Soviet Union
Soviet colonel generals
Soviet Air Force generals
Soviet test pilots
Russian aviation record holders
Soviet aviation record holders
Flight distance record holders
Recipients of the Order of the Red Banner
Recipients of the Order of Suvorov, 2nd class
Commandeurs of the Légion d'honneur
Gromov Flight Research Institute employees
Central Aerohydrodynamic Institute employees
People from Tver
People from Tver Governorate
Burials at Novodevichy Cemetery